Ganoderma sichuanense is a flat polypore mushroom of the genus Ganoderma.

References

Ganodermataceae
Dietary supplements
Medicinal fungi